Prague Independent Film Festival (PIFF) is an international film festival held annually in August in Prague, the capital of Czech Republic. The festival focuses on independent cinema. Festival founder and director is Diana Ringo.

History

2016
Prague Independent Film Festival was held for the first time on 15–18 August 2016 in the cinemas Kino Evald, Kino Atlas and Kino Lucerna. The festival program consisted of 33 films.
Opening film of the festival was Rocco has Your Name by Angelo Orlando. Angelo Orlando won the Best Screenplay award and the leading actor Michele Venitucci received the Best Actor award.

Grand Prix of the festival – The Golden Eagle – was awarded to the Bulgarian drama film Sinking of Sozopol by Kostadin Bonev.

Shamim Sarif received the Best Feature Film award for her espionage drama Despite the Falling Snow based on the best selling eponymous novel written by herself. Rebecca Ferguson was awarded Best Actress and Anthony Head received the Best Supporting Actor award.

Best Animated Film was awarded to The Snow Queen 2 from the Russian animation company Wizart Animation. The film was written and directed by Aleksey Tsitsilin and produced by Timur Bekmambetov.

Best Short Film was awarded to the short film Cora made by Kevin Maxwell, a student of Santa Monica College who was supervised by Salvador Carrasco.

2017
The opening film of the festival was Collector by Alexei Krasovsky. Alexei Krasovsky received the Best Director, Gustav Meyrink Prize and Konstantin Khabensky received the Best Actor award.

The film Maya Dardel, written and directed by Magdalena Zyzak and Zachary Cotler received the Best Screenplay award and Lena Olin received the Best Actress award.

Train Driver's Diary directed by Milos Radovic received the Grand Prix, Best Feature Film and Lazar Ristovski received the Best Actor prize.

Gallery

Winners

2021
Grand Prix
The Final Stand — Directed by Vadim Shmelyov
Best Director
The Final Stand —  Directed by Vadim Shmelyov
Best Feature
The Stairs —  Directed by Peter "Drago" Tiemann
Best Cinematography
Sashka. A Soldier's Diary (ru) — Directed by Kirill Zaytsev. Cinematography by Vladimir Klimov
Best Screenplay
Sashka. A Soldier's Diary — Directed by Kirill Zaytsev. Screenplay by Ivan Klochko & Igor Konyaev.
Best Documentary
OLEG — Directed by Nadia Tass
Best Documentary ex aequo
The Great Suppression: How Covid-19 Reignited the Fight for Life & Liberty — Directed by Deborah Wright
Best Actor
Sergey Bezrukov — The Final Stand
Best Supporting Actor
John Schneider —  The Stairs
Best Music Score
The Final Stand — Score by Yuri Poteenko
Best Short Film
The Stench — Directed by Won Jang
Best Short Film Director
Radda Novikova — Moscow Slide
Best Experimental
Geneva Jacuzzi's Casket — Directed by Chris Friend
Best Student Film
Old Cliff Rising — Curtis Roland
Best Art Direction
The Swamp — Directed by Erkki Perkiömäki
Best Animation
Feeling Lonely — Directed by Julian Nazario Vargas
Best Music Video
Mari Kraimbrery - Pryatalas v vannoi —  Directed by Serghey Grey

2020
Grand Prix
Lost Transmissions — Directed by Katharine O'Brien
Best Feature Film
Man from Beirut — Directed Christoph Gampl
Best Director
Raimundas Banionis — Purple Mist
Best Screenplay
Purple Mist — Raimundas Banionis
Best Actor
Simon Pegg — Lost Transmissions
Best Actress
Juno Temple — Lost Transmissions
Lucie Vondráčková — Beyond her Lens
Best Short Film
Unknown Mother — Wai Yin Wong
Best Music Video
Nice Shoes — Directed by Jonathan Lawrence
Best Student Film
Out of Touch — Directed by Bobby Murphy
Best Art Direction
Eerie Fairy Tales — Directed by Meet Sander
Best Documentary
Living in the Age of Miracles' — Directed by Mia Tomikawa
Best CinematographyMan from Beirut — Cinematography by Eeva Fleig
Best Animated FilmSpectre's Bride — Directed by Francesca Borgatta
Best Experimental FilmLast Film — Directed by Martiros Vartanov

2019
Grand PrixM — Directed by Anna Eriksson
Gustav Meyrink Prize (Jury Prize) The Snow Queen: Mirrorlands — Directed by Robert Lence, Alexey Tsitsilin
Best Feature FilmM — Directed by Anna Eriksson
Best Director
Kostadin Bonev — Away from the ShoreBest ScreenplayNight Walk — Aziz Tazi
Best Actor
Mickey Rourke — Night Walk
Best Short FilmAji — Anastasia Berezovsky
Best Music VideoDark like the night. Karenina-2019 — Directed by Radda Novikova
Best Student FilmHinge — Directed by Lisa Ann Mayo
Best Art DirectionLand of Winter — Directed by Tommy Creagh
Best DocumentaryTo tell a Ghost — Directed by Chris Piotrowicz, Stefan Ehrhardt
Best CinematographyAway from the Shore — Cinematography by Konstantin Zankov
Best Animated FilmBurning Bright — Directed by Aaron Bierman
Best Experimental FilmWe are in a Dream — Directed by Henna Välkky, Eesu Lehtola

2018
Grand PrixOctav — Directed by Serge Ioan Celebidachi
Honorary Award
Konstantin Khabensky
Best Feature FilmIvanov — Directed by Dimitri Falkovich
Best Director
Graham Streeter — I May RegretBest ScreenplayI May Regret — Graham Streeter
Best Actor
Marcel Iures — Octav
Best Short FilmMr. Goody — Jason MacDonald
Best Music Video#INSTAGRAM — Directed by Valeriya Gai Germanika
Best Art DirectionDance to the Party — Directed by Wayne Isham
Best DocumentaryBallad of the Righteous Merchant — Directed by Herbert Golder
Best CinematographyIvanov — Cinematography by Georges Lechaptois
Best Animated FilmMoon's Milk — Directed by Ri Crawford
Best Experimental FilmIt Grows Dark — Directed by Benjamin Capps

2017

Grand PrixTrain Driver's Diary – Directed by Milos Radovic
Best Feature FilmTrain Driver's Diary – Directed by Milos Radovic
Best Director
 Alexei Krasovsky – CollectorBest Screenplay
 Zachary Cotler and Magdalena Zyzak – Maya DardelBest Cinematography
 Rana Kamran – Mah e MirBest Actor
 Lazar Ristovski – Train Driver's Diary Konstantin Khabensky – CollectorBest Actress
 Lena Olin – Maya DardelBest Short Film
 The Light Thief – Eva Daoud
Best Experimental Film
 Time – Retrograde — Directed by David Ellis
Best Art Direction
 Ghosts on the Road to Camalt – Directed by Jason Tovey
Best Music Video
 God Came 'Round – Directed by Derek Frey
Best Student Film
 Muñecas – Directed by Ozzy Ozuna
Gustav Meyrink Prize (Jury Prize)
 Collector – Directed by Alexei Krasovsky

2016
Grand Prix
 Sinking of Sozopol — Directed by Kostadin Bonev
Best Feature Film
 Despite the Falling Snow — Directed by Shamim Sarif
Best Director
 Kostadin Bonev — Sinking of SozopolBest Screenplay
 Angelo Orlando — Rocco Has Your NameBest Cinematography
 Konstantin Zankov — Sinking of SozopolBest Actor
 Michele Venitucci — Rocco Has Your Name
Best Actress
 Rebecca Ferguson — Despite the Falling Snow
Best Supporting Actor
 Anthony Head — Despite the Falling Snow
Best Short Film
 Cora — Directed by Kevin Maxwell
Best Experimental Film
 NO SIGNAL — Directed by David Ellis
Best Animated Film
 The Snow Queen 2 — Directed by Aleksey Tsitsilin
Best Comedy Film
 Seth — Directed by Zach Lasry
Best Horror Film
 Woods — Directed by Sean van Leijenhorst
Best Art Direction
 Forgiveness — Directed by Rima Irani
Best Special Effects
 Forgiveness — Directed by Rima Irani
Best Music Score
 Green Lake — Directed by Derek Frey
Best Music Video
 FIRE'' by The Winery Dogs — Directed by Steven Lyon

References 

 Pražský festival nezávislých filmů | atlasceska.cz (Czech)

External links 

 Official website of the Prague Independent Film Festival
 PIFF 2016 Press Release

Film festivals in Prague
August events
Summer events in the Czech Republic